Cristin McCarthy Vahey is an American politician serving as a member of the Connecticut House of Representatives from the 133rd district. Elected in November 2014, she assumed office on January 7, 2015.

Early life and education 
Vahey was born in West Chester, Pennsylvania. She earned a Bachelor of Arts degree in economics and government from the University of Notre Dame and a Master of Social Work from the University of Washington School of Social Work.

Career 
Vahey began her career as a social worker. She was elected to the Connecticut House of Representatives in November 2014 and assumed office on January 7, 2015. Since 2019, she has served as co-chair of the House Planning and Development Committee.

Personal life 
Vahey and her husband, Brian Vahey, live in Fairfield, Connecticut and have three children.

References 

Living people
Year of birth missing (living people)
People from West Chester, Pennsylvania
University of Notre Dame alumni
University of Washington School of Social Work alumni
Democratic Party members of the Connecticut House of Representatives
Women state legislators in Connecticut
People from Fairfield, Connecticut
21st-century American women